The 1998 International Raiffeisen Grand Prix was a men's tennis tournament played on Clay in St. Pölten, Austria that was part of the International Series of the 1998 ATP Tour. It was the eighteenth edition of the tournament and was held from 18–24 May 1998.

Seeds
Champion seeds are indicated in bold text while text in italics indicates the round in which those seeds were eliminated.

Draw

Finals

Top half

Bottom half

References

Singles
Hypo Group Tennis International